The 31st Golden Rooster Awards were held in Hohhot, Inner Mongolia, China, and broadcast by CCTV Movie Channel. Nominees and winners are listed below, winners are in bold.

I Am Not Madame Bovary was the biggest winner, receiving three awards, including Best Director, Best Actress and Best Supporting Actor. Saving Mr. Wu won two awards including Best Editing and Best Supporting Actor. Deng Chao won the Best Actor award and Fan Bingbing won the Best Actress award.

Winners and nominees

References

External links 

2016
Golden Rooster
Golden Rooster